Callville is a former settlement of Clark County in the U.S. state of Nevada. Abandoned in 1869, it was submerged under Lake Mead when the Colorado River was dammed, Callville Bay retaining the name. At one time, it was noted to be the southernmost outpost of the Mormon settlement.

Geography
Located  from Salt Lake City, Calville was situated on the west bank of the Colorado River, in what was at the time Pah-Ute County, Arizona Territory. The main road to the settlement was along the Virgin River close to St. Thomas, Nevada before heading over hills to the west. A road connected Callville with the main highway at Las Vegas.

History

Callville was established on December 2, 1864 by Anson Call, Dr. James M. Whitmore, A. M. Cannon, Jacob Hamblin and son. It was at the time the southernmost outpost of Mormon settlement. The settlement was made by Call "as agent for the Trustee in Trust (the President) of the Church in December, 1864, according to a plan which was conceived of at that time to bring the Church immigration from Europe to Utah via Panama, the Gulf of California and up the river to this landing." A number of Salt Lake City merchants worked in conjunction with the plan to build a warehouse on the Colorado River for goods portage. On November 1, 1864 Call was directed to put together a suitable company, find a road to the Colorado River, explore it, locate a suitable locale for a warehouse, build it, and create a settlement by the landing. In order to accomplish this, in St. George, he employed Hamblin and son, Cannon and Whitmore. It was located just below the confluence of Callville Wash with the Colorado River.

Callville was one of seven Mormon settlements on or near the Muddy River, the others being St. Thomas, Saint Joseph, Overton, West Point, Mill Point later Simonsville and Rioville on the Colorado River above its confluence with the Virgin River.  Callville became the county seat of Pah-Ute County, Arizona Territory, in December 1865, before the seat was moved on October 1, 1867 to St. Thomas.

During the American Civil War in the 1860s, it was used as a garrison by the Army and as a landing point for Colorado River steamboats. The military shut down the garrison at Callville in 1869. A year after the American Civil War ended, steamboat began to travel on the Colorado River from the Gulf of California to Callville. But immediately thereafter, Congress realigned the states of Arizona and Nevada, which incorporated Callville into the state of Nevada. From 1867 to 69, Octavius Decatur Gass was Callville's postmaster; but by 1869, the port of Callville was deemed to be too far up the Colorado for steamboat navigation. The Deseret News noted that the port of Callville was abandoned in June of that year. The news story was in connection with the escape of horse thieves who used four large doors from the abandoned settlement's warehouse as a raft. The storehouse was still noted as standing in 1892.

Later in 1921, a large deposit of colemanite was discovered near Callville Wash.

Callville was submerged under  of water after the Colorado River was dammed to form Lake Mead. Callville Bay recreation area is located at the site.

References

Bibliography

External links
 Photos from hdl.huntington.org, The Huntington Digital Libraty, The Otis Marston Colorado River Collection: 
  The steamer "Colorado" takes on fuel and cargo; Callville.  If this is Callville before it was deserted in 1869 then this steamboat can only be the Esmerelda, which visited Callville only once, arriving on October 8, 1866.  Otherwise it must be another landing, unless, unknown to history, Callville had been revived as a seasonal woodyard landing between 1879 and 1887.  In those years the Colorado Steam Navigation Company sent the Gila many times and once in 1881, the Mohave II, up to Rioville from the El Dorado Canyon mines for salt during the high water months.(See  Richard E. Lingenfelter, Steamboats on the Colorado River, 1852-1916, University of Arizona Press, Tucson, 1978, pp. 76,78).  The "Colorado" was never sent up to this point on the river, and the Mohave II had two stacks, so if this is not the Esmerelda in 1866, this would be the single stack Gila between 1879 and 1887.  
  Callville, Jan. 15, 1912, Photographer: Ellsworth Kolb
 Ruins at Callville, 1923
 Ruins of old Callville as Lake filled.
  Callville,Feb. 23, 1935

Ghost towns in Clark County, Nevada
Inland port cities and towns in Nevada
Lake Mead
Steamboat transport on the Colorado River
Populated places established in 1864
1864 establishments in Arizona Territory
Former county seats in Arizona